The Moldova men's national tennis team represents Moldova in Davis Cup tennis competition and are governed by the Moldova Republic Tennis Federation. They have not competed since 2018.

They won Group III in 2000.

History
Moldova competed in its first Davis Cup in 1995.  Moldavian players previously represented the Soviet Union.

Current team (2022) 

 Alexander Cozbinov
 Ilya Snitari
 Egor Matvievici
 Ilie Cazac (Junior player)

See also
Davis Cup
Moldova Fed Cup team

References

External links

Davis Cup teams
Davis Cup
Davis Cup